New Vernon is a hamlet in Orange County, in the U.S. state of New York.

History
A post office called New Vernon was established in 1822, and remained in operation until 1853. The community's name means "New Spring", vernus meaning "spring" in Latin.

References

Hamlets in Orange County, New York